Kolah Namadi ((), Kolāh namadī, pronounced: kolaah namadee) is a traditional Iranian wool felt hat worn by men in parts of Iran.  They come in variety of colours and shapes depending on the region in Iran or the clan that wears it.  Today they are worn mostly for ceremonial purposes.

Etymology

Kolāh is the Persian word for hat whereas namad is the type of material the hat is made from.  Together the word Kolāh namadī means a hat made of [the material] namad.

Process of production

Kolah Namadi is a felt hat made out of wool.  The hat is made out of sheep, camel or goat hair wool and compressed using heat and water.  The wool is mixed with a binding material such as starch, oil, grease, eggs or soap and then given its form using a mould.  The hat is shaped into the style specific to the people of the region.

History

The technique of felting was originally devised in Central Asia in 5th to 3rd Century B.C.  Historically wearing a hat was a symbol of honour and pride among Iranian men.  Reliefs dating back to ancient Persia illustrate Kolah Namadi and were regular features of Persian and Greek Art.  In early twentieth century, Iranian gangs of men used to wear Kolāh namadī as an essential part of their identity and pride.

In popular culture

Kolah Namadi is regularly featured in Iranian historical films.  A 1966 romance film was also given the title Kolah Namadi (The Felt-Hatted Man)

References

Hats
Iranian clothing